Wungong Regional Park is a conservation park near Bedfordale in the Perth Hills, 20 kilometres south-east of Perth, Western Australia, located within the City of Armadale.

Overview
Wungong Regional Park was named after the Wungong townsite, established in 1909 which, in turn, had been named after the Wungong Brook, which was first traced by European explorers in 1835. The regional park's was name was confirmed in 2008, alongside three other regional parks and three national parks in the area, which were renamed to reflect the Aboriginal heritage of the area.

Wungong is one of eleven regional parks in the Perth region of Western Australia. The purpose of these regional parks is to serve as urban havens to preserve and restore cultural heritage and valuable ecosystems as well as to encourage sustainable nature-based recreation activities.

Area

Wungong Regional Park consists of the following reserves:

References

External links
 Parks and Wildlife Service: Wungong Regional Park
 Urban Bushland Council WA Inc.: Bungendore Park
 City of Armadale Bungendore Park Strategic Directions (2009)

Parks in Perth, Western Australia
Regional parks in Western Australia
City of Armadale
Darling Range
Noongar placenames